The 1872 United States presidential election in Nebraska took place on November 5, 1872, as part of the 1872 United States presidential election. Voters chose three representatives, or electors to the Electoral College, who voted for president and vice president.

Nebraska voted for the Republican candidate, Ulysses S. Grant, over Liberal Republican candidate Horace Greeley. Grant won Nebraska by a margin of 41.36%.

With 70.68% of the popular vote, Nebraska would be Grant's fourth strongest victory in terms of percentage in the popular vote after Vermont, South Carolina and Rhode Island.

Results

See also
 United States presidential elections in Nebraska

References

Nebraska
1872
1872 Nebraska elections